Karpoš Sokoli is a basketball club based in Skopje, North Macedonia. They currently play in the Macedonian Second  League.

For the first time in their history, Karpoš Sokoli was invited to the ABA League for the 2016–17 season which is considered to be the largest success of the club so far.

History

Beginnings
KK Karpoš has been established on 31 December 1996. From the 2000–01 season the club is participating in the first league of Macedonia and the name of the well known basketball academy "Sokoli" has been added to the club's name. Since then the club's name is Karpoš Sokoli 2000 Skopje.

Despite all the difficulties through the past decades, Karpoš Sokoli are, thanks to the enthusiasm and persistence of its founder Ognen Dedić, one of only few clubs that have managed to maintain continuity in senior competitions, while not neglecting the successful work with youth categories, which was club's trademark from its beginnings.

Glory Days

From the 2012–13 season the Municipality of Karpoš started to finance the basketball club and since the May 2015 it became a shareholder of the club. Since then, the Club has started to develop with respectable intensity. Every new season the club is achieving better and better results.

The most successful season in club's history so far is the 2015–16 season, when the club reached the finals of Macedonian National Cup and Semi-finals of the Macedonian National Championship, after finishing as runners-up in the regular part of the season.

For the first time in their history, Karpoš Sokoli managed to achieve the promotion to the ABA League for the 2016–17 season, which is considered to be the largest success of the club so far.

On 19 February 2017, the club won its first national title by defeating Feni Industries in the final of the Macedonian Basketball Cup.

Honours

Domestic Achievements
 Macedonian League
Runners-up (1): 2016–17
 Macedonian Cup
Winners (1): 2017
 Runners-up (1): 2016
 Macedonian Super Cup
Runners-up (1): 2016

Players

Current roster

Depth chart

Notable players

 Darko Sokolov
 Bojan Trajkovski
 Igor Penov
 Angel Tasevski
 Dime Tasovski
 Edis Nuri
 Igor Mijajlović 
 Dragan Labović
 Strahinja Milošević
 Dragan Zeković
 Filip Šepa
 Dušan Knežević
 Marko Boltić
 Aleksandar Petrović
 Zoran Vrkić
 Dominik Mavra
 Kendrick Perry
 Thad McFadden
 Darius Rice
 Anton Kazarnovski
 Chris Warren

Head coaches

 Ognen Dedić
 Aleksandar Petrović
 Borče Daskalovski
 Sašo Todorovski
 Boban Mitev
 Saša Katalinić
 Mihajlo Naumovski
 Siniša Matić
 Dragan Nikolić

KK Karpoš Sokoli in European competitions

2017 FIBA Champions League

2017 FIBA Europe Cup

References

External links
 Eurobasket.com KK Karpos Sokoli
 FIBA Profile

Basketball teams in North Macedonia
Sport in Skopje
Basketball teams established in 1996